Manuel Carbonell (October 25, 1918 – November 10, 2011) was a Cuban Contemporary and Modern artist, regarded as among the greatest Cuban sculptors of his generation.  He was part of the generation of Cuban artists, which includes Wifredo Lam and Agustín Cárdenas, that studied at the Escuela Nacional de Bellas Artes "San Alejandro", Havana, Cuba.  Carbonell's inexhaustible vision and his ever-changing style is the product of a brilliant talent with an academic background.  Ceaselessly searching for the essence of form and the absence of details, he empowered a sense of strength and monumentality to his work.  Until the age of 92, he had continued to work daily in his studio.

Childhood
Carbonell was born on October 25, 1918, in Sancti Spiritus  ("Holy Spirit"), Cuba. He had two sisters the older, Josephine and the younger Angela. His father came from a family of eighteen brothers and sisters. The family history has its roots in early sugar farming, from the early 1800s.

At an early age the family moved to the city of Cienfuegos and Carbonell went to study at "Monserrat" a primary school in the city. This proved to be the beginning of many lasting friendships.  Since his early childhood he was recognized for his interest in drawings and carvings.  Continuing on to his more formative academic years, in Havana he attended El Colegio de Belen, a Jesuit Preparatory School where he excelled in the classes involving art and history.

Creativity

Carbonell first realized he wanted to be a sculptor when he was eight or nine years old.  He was always making little figures with clay and whenever he found a piece of paper, he would doodle little figures on it.  His harshest punishment as a child was when his mother took away his pencils and paper.  Having the understanding that a piece of paper could be torn apart and disappear, ingrained in him that permanence could be achieved better by sculpting.  Depression would set in when he was not involved in the process of creation.  Quoting him, "Something curious happens to me when I sit down to begin the process of translating the images in my imagination into this third dimension.  I see the whole piece finished, actually totally finished, in my minds eye, even before I begin.  But, as we all know, imagination can be very treacherous."

Education

In 1937, he wanted to learn about art and found out about "San Alejandro", the renowned Escuela Nacional de Bellas Artes (National Academy of Fine Arts) in Havana.  When he arrived, they asked him what previous training he had?  Explaining, he told them he had none.  The school wanted him to go through a preliminary process for two years prior to attending, however he managed to prove himself with a clay carving that he had made that following weekend and they accepted him as a student on the spot.  Carbonell was eighteen years old and barely beginning at San Alejandro when he fell down some stairs.  The injury was very severe; one of his kidneys had ruptured as a result of the impact.  He spent nearly one year partly paralyzed, unable to move easily.  He couldn't attend classes of course, the despair he felt, lying there, all that time was immeasurable.  But little by little he learned to walk again, he just stubbornly refused to give up, finally able to return to San Alejandro.  At the Academy Carbonell studied under the guidance of Juan José Sicre, a former student of Antoine Bourdelle, Rodin's favorite disciple. In 1945 at the age of 27 Carbonell graduated with the title of Professor of Drawing and Sculpture.  Carbonell met and worked alongside some great artist, Fidelio Ponce, Victor Manuel, Amelia Pelaez,Roberto Estopiñan and many more.  At San Alejandro, artistic excellence, meant one must measure up to maximum standards or smash it into pieces and start again, that was the norm.

Beginnings as a sculptor

His classical and religious period developed between 1945 and 1959 some of his many important commissions included the stone carvings as bas-reliefs of the Twelve Stations of the Cross, along with The Last Rites located at Las Lomas Del Jacan in San Miguel de los Baños, Matanzas province. Last Rites, was exhibited at the National Capitol in Havana. He also sculpted a statue of the Virgin Mary for the Association of Catholic University students in Havana. A life size wood carving of a crucifixion for the chapel at the Covadonga sugar mill in Las Villas, Cuba.

Carbonell's work received immediate recognition.  Dr. Roberto Lopez-Goldaras, the art critic of Havana's Diario De La Marina, in Havana, said in 1951 about his work, "We foresee for the young and distinguished sculptor Manuel Carbonell a great future; (he) who had been able to conceive a sculpture like "Eternity", will without a doubt, earn himself a glorious name, which is already a euphoric name, accredited among the literary and artistic names of Cuba."

Carbonell participated in numerous national competitions and was the recipient of many awards. The life-size stone carving Fin de Una Raza (End of A Race) earned him his first international award in 1954, for the III Bienal Hispanoamericana de Arte, in Barcelona, Spain.  The sculpture became part of the collection of the Museum of Fine Arts in Havana; it appeared on the cover of Reader's Digest magazine in May 1956.

Professional journey

For the first commercial television broadcast, "Union Radio Television", Carbonell was the host and interviewer for a weekly television program where he interviewed artist as his topic of discussion, to include Wifredo Lam, amongst others. He worked in various aspects of television and production whereby he won an award in set design for the 'Union De La Cronica Tele-Radial Diaria" in the second festival.
By 1954 Carbonell left for Europe visiting countless museums with the goal of experiencing for himself the opportunity to stand in front of great masterpieces to appreciate them and learn. He was able to explore countries such as Spain, Italy, France and England and understand their unique cultures. Europe proved to inspire Carbonell as he studied the art of the Impressionist and Abstract artists, which inspired a change in direction to give form a sense of movement.

In addition to his accomplishments as a sculptor, he owned an operated his own interior design business "Carbonell Studio". Here he designed from French to Modern furniture, incorporating his other beloved interest of creating an environment. He also had a high-end luxury boutique of decorative objects, which ultimately provided him with an ulterior motive of a purchasing trip, he was granted a visa to travel to the United States.  The perfect opportunity for defecting and leaving his homeland.

Exile to New York City

In 1959, Carbonell fled Cuba where he could no longer live under a totalitarian regime.  Leaving behind his wealth, his established positions, his sculptures, and most importantly his family. He arrived in New York City with only his tremendous talent and $200 in cash and initially took up residency at the YMCA.

Carbonell moved away from his classical and religious period, in Cuba in the late 1940s and 1950s through the commencement and development of his modern expressions of the 1960s.

Although at the beginning deeply depressed, this new trajectory first moved him to a unique form of figurative abstraction where the anatomy was subjected to the anatomical elongation of the subject matter.

Carbonell's new career in America started almost haphazardly and by chance.  As payment to his then public relations manager Ted Materna and Associates he provided one of his first sculptures in clay that he had created.  A very prominent doctor, Paul Henkind, then Chief of the Department of Ophthalmology at Monte Fiore Hospital, NYC, noticed the incredible sculpture and stated to Mr. Materna "I didn't know you owned a Rodin"?  Which was actually a Carbonell. He insisted on meeting Carbonell to see his work and showed up unannounced at his studio in SoHo, that same evening with his wife they purchased their own Carbonell and became long lasting patrons.

Shortly after in 1961, Manuel Carbonell was introduced to Dr. Fred Schoneman, the influential and renowned gallery owner, who was impressed with what he saw of Carbonells work, and invited him to become the gallery's first and only sculptor and he is quoted saying "He is indeed, as the critics have acclaimed and posterity will confirm, one of the Masters of Sculpture of our times".  The gallery exhibited Carbonell's sculptures alongside European Masters and French Impressionist paintings of the 19th and 20th centuries, such as Braque, Chagall, Monet, Degas, Pissarro, Picasso, Gauguin, Renior and others. Professional artistic success came with his new figuration sculptures when in 1963, he celebrated the first of his several "One Man Show" at the renowned Schoneman Gallery, Madison Avenue, in New York City, and collaborated in One Man Show's with other galleries, exceeding ten years, until Dr. Schonemans' passing.

For his first exhibition at Schoneman Galleries, Carbonell departed from clay and plaster forms and worked in hammered metals.  During this time, one sensed the influence of Pablo Gargallos' figurative abstract modern sculptures.  In 1967 he extended his frontier to include another one-man show in San Francisco at the Maxwell Galleries.  By 1971,Carbonell held two exhibits, one again at Schoneman and the other at the Bacardi Galleries in Miami, Florida.  At this time, Carbonell moved from his previously acclaimed hammered metals and bronze finishes to high-polished bronzes sculptures. This new work took on a completely different aesthetic, becoming more abstract.  Rounded volumes replaced the elongated anatomical shapes, present in Lovers, Madonna of the Moon and Figurative Form.  During an exhibition at Galerie Moos, in 1972, in Montreal, Canada, the artist unveiled new subject matters through his high-polish bronze sculptures of Sea Horses, a Sea Lion, Snail and Mermaid.

Renamed as Randall Galleries, a former employee of Schoneman Galleries took control over the gallery in 1973, while Carbonell was preparing an exhibition that would pay tribute to dance.  The dancer series was a means to show his appreciation of dance as an art form, embracing the two art forms. The delicate lines of the ballet dancers are executed from a single point of balance. The graceful forms portray the excitement of their movement and beauty which is captured in reflective golden bronze. The opportunity to amplify this series turned into a benefit for The City Center in New York City to have an exhibition titled "Homage to Ballet" in 1974.

Reuniting with family

Carbonell took in his two nephews, in 1960, Ricardo 15 and Luis 13 to live with him in New Jersey to save them from being inducted into Castro's military army. Soon enough, nine months later his father Manuel and his sisters Angela and Josefina with her 2-year-old daughter, Clara were able to leave Cuba and come to Miami.  After so many years living apart Carbonell was anxious to rejoin his family, he moved his studio to Miami in 1976.  Keeping a much lower profile he continued creating and selling his sculptures and concentrated on important private commissions. During 1977 Carbonell was given the challenge to construct the "Virgin of Fatima", for the Blue Army Shrine, in Washington, New Jersey. The 26-foot, 12,000 pound bronze sculpture was placed on top of a 150-foot shrine, considered one of the largest sculptures cast in America in the 20th century. His first commissioned bronze monument in the United States: A special and personal monumental sculpture during this same time was a composition of a 10-foot in height horse and rider, balanced on two points, which was commissioned by Burt Reynolds of himself for the entrance of the Burt Reynolds Jupiter Theatre, Jupiter, Florida.    The two men had a very fond and enduring friendship.

The awards formally presented by The South Florida Entertainment Writers Associations (SFEWA), an organization of major media theater critics from Dade, Broward and Palm Beach Counties, on November 15, 1976, they selected Carbonell as the namesake. He was the creator of the award and The Estate of Manuel Carbonell continues to be the major benefactor of the "Carbonell Awards". They represent the highest achievement awards that annually recognizes and honors excellence in South Florida theater.  The organization considered this tribute to Carbonell, as he signified and represented one who devotes his life to art.

In 1976, Carbonell held a monographic exhibit at the Metropolitan Museum and Art Center, in Miami, Florida, on view at the opening of their newest gallery, where he introduced more than 20 of his latest works. (Now incorporated into, The Frost Art Museum). Between the late seventies and mid-eighties, the artist worked on private commissions and ventured creatively in designing jewelry and furniture. At that time, he had several one-man shows that were also presented at different galleries during this decade, including Steiner Gallery in Bal Harbor, West Avenue Gallery in Palm Beach, Camino Real in Boca Raton, all in Florida and the Ann Jacob Gallery, in Marietta, Georgia.

The White House

In 1976 Carbonell created the "Bicentennial Eagle", which he gifted to the United States of America, during a ceremony on the West Lawn of the White House in honor of the nation's Bicentennial Anniversary. During the bicentennial celebrations the sculpture was on display in the Great Hall of Commerce in Washington D.C.  This sculpture is now part of The Gerald R. Ford, Presidential Library, Ann Arbor, Michigan, which is technically a branch office of The National Archives and Records Administration Collection, that the Federal government oversees.

Beaux Arts Gallery

A formal representation begun in 1987 as Beaux Arts Gallery, Miami Florida, became the exclusive worldwide representative of Carbonell's work, under the Owner/Director, Ricardo J. Gonzalez III, an architect and Carbonell's nephew.

During the following years, his endless creative imagination took him to follow in the steps of European Masters such as Moore, Brancusi, and Arp and other artist of the figurative abstract movement.  In Carbonells' sculptures you can experience the monumentality of the works of Henry Moore, and the simplicity found in the works of Brancusi, Archipenko and Arp, but in his oeuvre, he sought a different form of figuration, where he searched for the essence of the form and the absence of details while empowering a feeling of monumentality to his sculptures.  At this time Carbonell moved from his high polished bronzes to dark patinas.  His figurative abstract sculptures created an impression or illusion of form and space, which are representational and based on the anatomical simplification of the form from a variety of sources.  His distinctive personal style is easily identifiable and recognized by the consistency in the originality of his works, the uniqueness of his interpretations and the sense of universal appeal that he imparted to his sculptures.

The years between 1987-88 marked a very creative and productive period for Carbonell.  Lovers, mother and child, dancers and the female figure intensified as subject matter in his artistic vision. He redefined forms and contours, while maintaining the anatomical essence of the human figure, bringing female sensuality to a point of abstraction, while displaying a sense of aesthetic basic principles in a simplified form.  A continuance of one-man shows and exhibits along with art fairs nationally and internationally have since to date been part of this relationship.

Having won a competition in 1989 to create a statue of the Cuban Apostle Jose Martí for the San Carlos Institute in Key West, Florida. Carbonell returned for this commission to his classical period to create the statue.

A subject very close to Carbonell's heart: the artist struggled with the challenge of translating the human Martí into the idealized and heroic universal figure that Martí's philosophy and spirituality represented. Conquering this challenge, in 1990 Carbonell moved to Pietrasanta, (Holy Stone) Italy to carve a 6-foot marble sculpture that portrays Martí with his left arm extended, as if to greet visitors, while the right hand rest on a bundle of wheat surrounded by the Cuban flag.  The symbolism conveyed by the statue is that a cause, like one stalk of wheat, may become weak, but becomes strong when its supporters band together.

The Miami River Bridge

Carbonell was selected in a competition in 1992, this was to create one of the largest bronze monuments in the State of Florida, the artwork for Miami's Brickell Avenue Bridge, Miami Florida. Carbonell created the 53-foot bronze public monument "The Pillar of History and the Tequesta Family", located mid-span on the bridge. The pillar illustrates a carved graphical narration of the lives of the Tequesta Indians, Miami's first inhabitants, featuring 150 figures.  At the top stands a 17-foot bronze sculpture, "Tequesta Family" portraying a Tequesta Indian warrior aiming an arrow to the sky with his wife and child at his side.  In the niches at the supporting piers are four 4-foot by 8-foot bronze bas reliefs honoring the quintessential Miami pioneers Henry Flagler, Dana A. Dorsey, William and Mary Brickell, Marjory Stoneman Douglas and Julia Tuttle, depicting them in their historical perpetual settings.  Twelve bronze bas-reliefs of Florida fauna are located at the base of the flagpoles on the walk ways of both sides of the bridge.

"Little Miracles", certainly an invaluable opportunity, I was in love with the project, first because the Tequesta's are a fascinating people, secondly, because it was an important monument, with such tremendous dimensions.  I am convinced that, previously, long ago, there were many civilizations more advanced than ours, who knew how to enjoy the beauty of the soul.  While I was in Pietrasanta, Italy to commence this two-year project, having finished all the bas-reliefs and having completed carving 3/5 of the pillar, I suffered a stroke. My left side was paralyzed, and being left-handed I was desperate. I kept asking the medical staff, "listen, when can I once again begin to move my arm, I am a sculptor", the reply "be patient" which I am not.  On the one hand, I would tell myself, "look Carbonell, you are no longer a sculptor, you have been a sculptor for more than seventy years, but you are no longer a sculptor now".  "Your left hand is paralyzed".  "Nobody can change that".  It's absurd but on the other hand, since I couldn't accept that, I would say, "yes, I can, I can change that".  The doctors released me from the hospital so I could emotionally feel better and come back in a couple of months to start my physical therapy.  Ten days later, I told my assistants to bring the unfinished portion and get me my tools, and bring them to the house because I wanted to start carving again.  Shortly thereafter, my therapy nurse that came to my house spread the news I was astonishing.  All my friends from the hospital arrived, they couldn't believe that I was already working, ok, maybe not with my left hand, but I was surely working with my right hand.  "My life is my work.  And my work is my life."

Other monuments to follow

Between 1996 and 1999, Carbonell remained in Pietrasanta working on two commissions for monumental sculptures:  "El Centinela del Rio", a 21-foot bronze sculpture depicting a Tequesta Indian blowing into a bronze and alabaster conch shell.  The sculpture is located at Tequesta Point on Brickell Key.  Serving as a welcoming site to all and luminous at night, at the entrance of the  Miami River.  Another is "The Manatee Fountain", consisting of three Indian children playing with two manatees, located at the walkway between, Two and Three Tequesta Point condominiums on Brickell Key, Miami, Florida.  Swire Properties and Manuel Carbonell had a unique patronage, not only is there "The Swire Art Trust", there was the "Swire Carbonell Scholarship Fund" for the Florida International University Foundation.

His modern monumental works, created in his unique and distinctive personal style, are part of important art collections and public spaces,  "Couple in Love" adorns the lobby of the Mandarin Oriental Hotel, Miami, "Lovers" is located at the entrance of the Carbonell Condominium, named in the artist honor, "Torso" formally at Selby's Five Point Park, downtown Sarasota then at the von Liebig Art Center in Naples, Florida.  "New Generation" is in Xujianhui Park, Shanghai, China.  The sculpture of " Amantes" now graces the grounds of The Buenaventura Golf and Beach Resort Panama, under the Autograph Collection of J.W. Marriott, Republic of Panama. "Abrazo" and "Couple in Love" enhance the first Ritz Carlton Hotel, in Bangalore, India.  "Mother and Child" together with "Amantes" are amongst the garden of Château de Vullierens, Vullierens, Switzerland, and "Birth of Eve" at the entrance rotunda of Brickell Key Two Condominium, Miami, Florida.

Later life
Manuel Carbonell died at Kindred Hospital in Coral Gables, Florida, on November 10, 2011, at the age of 93. He was survived by his two sisters, Josefina Gonzalez and Angela Carbonell; niece, Clara Falcon; and nephews, Ricardo and Luis Gonzalez. His funeral mass was held at the chapel of Belen Jesuit Preparatory School in Miami.  The sentiment of having the service take place at Belen was because Carbonell created and contributed to most everything in the chapel.

Gallery

Exhibitions
1945       Carbonell graduates from the Escuela Nacional de Bellas Artes "San Alejandro" with the title of Professor of Drawing and Sculpture.
1948       Competition for Pieta and Twelve Stations of the Cross, San Miguel de los Banos, Cuba.
1949       Exposicion del Museo Nacional de Cuba, National Show, Havana.
1954       Bienal Hispanoamericana de Arte, International Show, Barcelona.
1954       Exposicion Del Museo de Bellas Artes, National Show, Havana.
1959       Carbonell goes into exile in New York.
1963       Schoneman Galleries, 63 East 57th Street New York, begins to represent Carbonell, First One Man Show at Schoneman Galleries.
1965       Schoneman Galleries, 63 East 57th Street. New York. Second One Man Show, to benefit the NSID Educational Foundation.
1967       Maxwell Galleries, One Man Show, San Francisco.
1968       Schoneman Galleries, 823 Madison Avenue, New York, Third One Man Show at Schoneman Galleries.
1971       Schoneman Galleries, 823 Madison Avenue, New York, Fourth One Man Show.
1971       Bacardi Gallery One Man Show, Miami, Florida.
1972       Galerie Moss, One Man Show, Montreal, Canada.
1972       Ann Jacob Gallery, One Man Show, Marietta, Georgia.
1973       Galeria Internacional, Group Show of Cuban Artists, Caracas,Venezuela.
1974       Jockey Club Gallery, One Man Show, Miami, Florida.
1974       Randall Galleries, 823 Madison Avenue, New York. One Man Show, "Hommage to Ballet" to benefit City Center, New York.
1976       The White House, South Lawn, Carbonell presents his Bicentennial Eagle to the United States of America.
1976       Metropolitan Museum and Art Center, One Man Show, Miami, Florida.
1976       Carbonell Awards, highest achievement award for the theater in South Florida is named in his honor.
1977       Worth Avenue Gallery, One Man Show, Palm Beach, Florida.
1977       Deligny Gallery, One Man Show, Fort Lauderdale, Florida.
1978       Blue Army Shrine commissions 26-foot Madonna of Fatima, Washington, N.J.
1978       Blue Army Shrine, completion and dedication.
1981       Steiner Gallery, One Man Show, Miami, Florida.
1982       Carbonell creates and donates the artwork for the chapel of Belen Jesuit Preparatory School, in Miami, Florida.
1983       Steiner Gallery, One Man Show, Miami, Florida.
1985       Steiner Gallery, One Man Show, Miami, Florida.
1986       Burt Reynolds Dinner Theater, 15-foot Sculpture of Horse and Rider, Jupiter, Florida.
1987       Beaux Arts Gallery, in Miami, Florida, starts representing Carbonell.
1987       Americana Collection, history of America depicted in 14 sculptures.
1988       Wins competition for 6-foot marble sculpture of Cuban Patriot Jose Marti for the San Carlos Institute, Key West, Florida.
1989       Beaux Arts Gallery, One Man Show, Miami, Florida.
1989       Mielko Gallery, One Man Show, Nantucket.
1989	Chicago Invitational Art Fair, Chicago.
1990       Art Miami 1990, Miami, Florida.
1990       Beaux Arts Gallery, One Man Show, Miami, Florida.
1991       Beaux Arts Gallery, One Man Show, Miami, Florida.
1991       Excellence Award for the Arts from FACE, Facts About Cuban Exiles.
1992       Wins selection for the Brickell Avenue Bridge Artwork, Carbonell moves to Pietrasanta, Italy, to commence two-year project.
1995       Brickell Avenue Bridge, completion of 36-foot bronze bas-relief column, 17-foot sculpture of Teguesta Family, four 4-foot by 8-foot bas-reliefs of Miami's pioneers and twelve bas-reliefs of the Florida Fauna.
1996       Beaux Arts Gallery, One Man Show, Miami, Florida.
1998       One Man Show at One Brickell Square, Miami, Florida.
2000       Beaux Arts Gallery, One Man Show, Miami, Florida.
2001       Silvana Facchini Gallery, One Man Show, Miami, Florida.
2002       Silvana Facchini Gallery, One Man Show, Miami, Florida.
2003       Beaux Arts Gallery, One Man Show, Miami, Florida.
2003       Remy Toledo Gallery, One Man Show, New York.
2004       Beaux Arts Gallery, Permanent Exhibit, Miami, Florida.
2005       The Third Invitational Sarasota Season of Sculpture.
2005	Beaux Arts Gallery, Permanent Exhibit, Miami, Florida.
2006	Beaux Arts Gallery, Permanent Exhibit, Miami, Florida.
2007	Dedication to the City of Shanghai of the sculpture "New Generation", Shanghai, China.
2007	Ifa Gallery, Shanghai, China.
2007	Shanghai Art Fair, Shanghai, China.
2007	Beaux Arts Gallery,  Permanent Exhibit, Miami, Florida.
2007	Miami Art Fair, Miami, Florida.
2008	Art Madrid Art Fair, Madrid, Spain.
2008       Beaux Arts Gallery, Permanent Exhibit, Miami, Florida.
2008       ArteAmericas Art Fair, Miami, Florida.
2008       Art Shanghai 2008, Shanghai, China.
2008       Beaux Arts Gallery, Permanent Exhibit, Miami, Florida.
2008       The Shanghai Art Fair, Shanghai, China.
2009       Art Shanghai Art Fair, Shanghai, China.
2009       The Shanghai Art Fair, Shanghai, China.
2008       Art Miami Art Fair, Miami, Florida.
2009       Beaux Arts Gallery, Permanent Exhibit, Miami, Florida.
2010       Miami International Art Fair, Miami, Florida.
2010       Art Palm Beach, Palm Beach, Florida.
2010       ArteAmericas Art Fair, Miami, Florida.
2010       Art Shanghai 2010, Shanghai, China.
2011       ArteAmericas Art Fair, Miami Florida.
2011       Art Naples, Florida.
2011       Art Shanghai 2011, Shanghai, China.
2011       Beaux Arts Gallery, Permanent Exhibit, Miami, Florida.
2012       ArteAmericas Art Fair, Miami, Florida.
2012       Feria Iberoamericana de Arte, Caracas,Venezuela, Galeria Medicci.
2013       Art Wynwood Art Fair, Miami, Florida, Galeria Medicci.
2013       Feria Iberoamericana de Arte, Caracas, Venezuela, Galeria Medicci.
2014       Feria Iberoamericana de Arte, Caracas, Venezuela, Galeria Medicci.
2014       One Man Show, Galeria Medicci.
2014       Concept Sea Fair, Art Basel, Miami, Galeria Medicci.
2015       Aspen Art Fair, Kavachnina Contemporary, Miami.
2015       Adrian Kavachnina Galerie, Paris, France.
2016       Beaux Arts Gallery, Permanent Exhibition, Miami, Florida.
2016       Galeria Medicci, Caracas, Venezuela.
2016       Adrian Kavachnina Galerie, Paris, France.
2017       Beaux Arts Gallery, Permanent Exhibition, Miami, Florida.
2017       Galeria Medicci, Caracas, Venezuela.
2017       Adrian Kavachnina Galerie, Paris, France.
2018       Beaux Arts Gallery, Permanent Exhibition, Miami, Florida.
2019       Beaux Arts Gallery, Permanent Exhibition, Miami, Florida.
2019       Sultan/Delon Fine Art, Art Palm Beach, Florida.  
2020       Beaux Arts Gallery, Permanent Exhibition, Miami, Florida.
2020       Sultan/Delon Fine Art, Art Palm Beach, Florida.

References

 
  
 The Carbonell Awards | South Florida's Theater and Arts Honors
 
 Manuel Carbonell [ 1918 - 2011]

1918 births
2011 deaths
Cuban sculptors
Cuban emigrants to the United States
Cuban people of Catalan descent
American people of Catalan descent
People from Sancti Spíritus
Artists from Miami
Sculptors from Florida
Academia Nacional de Bellas Artes San Alejandro alumni